North Eastern Airways (NEA) was a British airline which operated from 1935 until the outbreak of World War II in 1939. Based initially in Newcastle upon Tyne, it operated routes from Scotland to London in competition with the railways, retaining its independence to the end.

History

Formation
The company was formed on 4 March 1935 by a group of investors headed by Ralph Beckett, 3rd Baron Grimthorpe. Lord Grimthorpe was a wealthy banker and racehorse owner who also had a keen interest in aviation. In 1931, with two De Havilland Aircraft Company employees A Hessel-Tiltman and Nevil Shute Norway along with Alan Cobham as directors, he became the chairman of Airspeed Ltd, which went on to create, among other notable aircraft, the Courier and Envoy transport aircraft.

With Lord Grimthorpe’s link with Airspeed, it was natural that the first aircraft that NEA acquired were three new Envoy 6-passenger airliners, becoming the first airline customer of the type.

The first service to be operated was the east coast route to Scotland, from London (Heston) to Leeds (Yeadon), Newcastle (Cramlington) and Edinburgh (Turnhouse). The fare between London and Edinburgh was £10. The inaugural flight started at Leeds and Bradford Municipal Aerodrome, otherwise known as Yeadon Airport, where on 8 April 1935 the first aircraft, Airspeed Envoy G-ADAZ, was named Tynedale by Mrs Anthony Eden (Beatrice Beckett). The aircraft was then flown, with Mrs Eden and other dignitaries on board, to Heston, where it skidded on landing, running into a fence. While this was an embarrassment for what had been the first ever scheduled flight operated from Yeadon, no one was harmed, and the aircraft suffered only superficial damage.

The Edinburgh leg could not initially be operated due to lack of radio and navigation aids, defeating the object of the exercise. Even when Edinburgh service did start, on 27 May, demand was so low that the whole route was closed on 27 June and the airline’s assets were taken over by another of Grimthorpe’s companies, Alp Aviation. The reason for the low demand was that existing railway services were fast, regular, comfortable, cheap, and much less dependent on the weather.

The route was restarted by NEA on 2 November 1936. This time the London terminus was Croydon Airport, and the Scottish one was Perth (Scone Aerodrome) which had opened earlier that year. The  airport at Newcastle had also changed with the opening of Woolsington Aerodrome (now Newcastle International Airport). Since Edinburgh was now being bypassed, stops, presumably by request, were made at Macmerry Airfield, 15 miles east of Edinburgh. The change of Scottish airport was because of pressure from the London and North Eastern Railway (L.N.E.R.) which was concerned about the competition on the Edinburgh route, and barred its ticket offices and other travel agents from selling the airline’s tickets. This time the airline persisted, even extending the service to Aberdeen (Dyce Airport), and by 1937 offering an express service from Croydon to Aberdeen with just one stop (at Doncaster). The Aberdeen link was soon abandoned because of a lack of radio aids there.

Growth

1937 was a year of expansion with the addition of De Havilland Rapides to the fleet, and with Doncaster Airport as the hub of new routes to Leeds, to Liverpool (Hooton Park) via Manchester (Barton Aerodrome) and to Hull (Hedon Aerodrome). From Hull they ran a ferry service with the Airspeed Couriers across the Humber Estuary to Grimsby (Waltham Aerodrome), a route pioneered by North Sea Aerial and General Transport in 1932-3. The airline had also established the Doncaster Aero Club as a subsidiary.

1937 was also the year when North Eastern Airways joined the International Air Traffic Association (IATA), later to become the International Air Transport Association. This gave the airline a degree of prestige and assisted in L.N.E.R abandoning their ticket sale ban from 21 December that year. Indeed cooperation grew, and in the Summer 1938 timetable it is noted that airline tickets and rail tickets on almost all the airline’s routes were “interavailable” with L.N.E.R. and L.M.S.R. (London, Midland and Scottish Railway) allowing outward journey by air and return by first-class rail, or outward journey by rail and return by air for a supplement.

When an Airspeed Envoy was delivered to the King's Flight in 1937, Lord Grimthorpe had a plaque installed at the front of the cabin of his Envoys informing the passengers that the aircraft was the same type in which the King flew.

In 1938 NEA operated special services to Glasgow (Renfrew Airport) for the Empire Exhibition which opened on 3 May.

The airline applied for a mail-carrying contract and was initially refused, but later granted, and their first mail flight, from Perth to Newcastle, then onwards on the route via Yeadon and Doncaster to Croydon was flown on 3 October 1938. The first sector of the route was flown by Rapide G-AFEP, and the remainder by Envoy G-ADAZ.

Also in 1938, the airline applied to the Air Ministry for permission to fly a route to Switzerland using Douglas DC-3 aircraft, starting in January 1939. This would have been operated as Alp Air Line, presumably the operating name of Alp Aviation. The plan was rejected.

In 1939 the airline’s schedules to both Glasgow and Edinburgh (which had been reinstated in 1938) were replaced by the new Central Scotland Airport at Grangemouth which opened on 1 May. There was a new connection from Perth to Dundee, and a link was established with Scottish Airways for connection from Perth to Inverness, Wick and Orkney. A new summer daily route was advertised between Croydon and Knocke (Le Zoute airport) in Belgium. None of these arrangements would last for long.

Demise
All NEA’s activities stopped with the outbreak of World War II in September 1939, and their headquarters were moved to Liverpool Speke Airport. Most of the fleet had been disposed of during the earlier part of 1939, but the Rapides were retained, coming under the control of National Air Communications (NAC), and were all impressed into military service in early 1940.

One part of the company kept going, however; a subsidiary, Martin Hearn Ltd. Its eponymous founder had worked for Alan Cobham before setting up as an aircraft engineer at Liverpool’s Hooton Park in 1935. At some point North Eastern Airways must have acquired it. During the war it was very active assembling, maintaining and repairing military aircraft, possibly with remaining NEA staff working there, and it continued for several years after the war.

Meanwhile, the remains of NEA were bought by L.N.E.R in April 1944, and they possibly sold off Martin Hearn Ltd in 1947 when its name was changed to Aero-Engineering and Marine (Merseyside). Hern himself departed to run a hotel adjacent to the airfield. North Eastern Airways was one of the airlines taken over by BEA on 1 February 1947 in the nationalisation of all private scheduled operators, but this was a formality.

Routes
From timetables.

April 1935

London (Heston) — Leeds (Yeadon) — Newcastle upon Tyne (Cramlington) — Edinburgh (Turnhouse) weekdays only
(Edinburgh 'subject to permission')

Summer 1937

London (Croydon) — Doncaster — Leeds Bradford† — York† — Newcastle upon Tyne† — Perth/Dundee — Aberdeen daily
(† = request stop)

Grimsby — Hull — Doncaster — Manchester — Liverpool
(Doncaster — Liverpool operated by KLM Royal Dutch Airlines)

April 1939

London (Croydon) — Newcastle upon Tyne — Central Scotland Airport — Perth — Aberdeen daily

London (Croydon) — Knock-Le Zoute daily

Fleet

† These aircraft were previously sold to Spanish Republican procurement organisations including Union Founders’ Trust, Federation Populaire des Sports Aeronautiques, and Compagnie Air Taxi, Vienna. These export sales were blocked and the aircraft were sold on.

Two other aircraft, De Havilland DH.60G Gipsy Moth G-ABLE and DH.94 Moth Minor G-AFPK were registered to NEA for short periods before being transferred to Doncaster Aero Club.

The livery was overall silver with black lettering and trim.

Accidents and incidents
While operating for North Eastern Airways, Airspeed Courier G-ACSZ was involved in a fatal crash, and Envoy G-ADBZ crash-landed with no injuries and was returned to service. See Fleet list for details.

References

Bibliography

Defunct airlines of the United Kingdom
Airlines established in 1935